William Elden Kellar (born February 8, 1956) is a former gridiron football wide receiver who played part of one season in the National Football League for the Kansas City Chiefs.

Early life and college
Kellar was born in Longview, Washington, but played high school football at Hillsboro High School in the Portland metropolitan area where his father was the track coach. During the 1973 state championship game he scored two receiving touchdowns against Medford, which at the time was the second most in championship game history. He played college football at Stanford University as a wide receiver.

Professional football
After college, he was drafted by the Chiefs in the seventh road of the 1978 draft. Kellar played five games for Kansas City wearing 82, but did not accumulate any statistics. He injured his knee in week 6 against Tampa Bay and was placed on injured reserve, missing the remainder of the season.

References

1956 births
Living people
American football wide receivers
Stanford Cardinal football players
Kansas City Chiefs players
Players of American football from Oregon
People from Longview, Washington
Sportspeople from Hillsboro, Oregon
Hillsboro High School (Oregon) alumni
Nike, Inc. people